The Awesomes is an American adult animated comedy streaming television series created by Seth Meyers and Mike Shoemaker for Hulu.  Meyers and Shoemaker serve as executive producers alongside Lorne Michaels. It debuted on August 1, 2013 and ended on November 3, 2015.

Premise

The show follows a group of superheroes who step in and replace the members of a legendary but disbanding superhero team. Under new leadership, The Awesomes attempt to put themselves back together in the face of intense media and government skepticism.

Episodes

International release
In Canada, The Awesomes aired on MUCH and on Teletoon's Teletoon at Night and Cartoon Network's Adult Swim late-night programming blocks. It also aired in the United States on Comedy Central and TBS and in Quebec on Télétoon's Télétoon la nuit block.

Production

In July 2007, Syfy gave a script commitment to the series. Syfy later passed on making the show, but MTV gave it a script commitment in June 2009. After MTV passed, Hulu gave it a 10 episode, straight to series order in April 2013.

Season 1 was sponsored by Jack Link's Beef Jerky. The product appeared in mid-credits scenes.

The show marks Hulu's second foray into original scripted programming. The first season premiered online on August 1, 2013. On September 19, 2013, it was reported that Hulu had announced The Awesomes had been renewed for a second season. The second season premiered on August 4, 2014. On August 19, 2014, Hulu renewed The Awesomes for a third season. On December 17, 2015, Hulu canceled The Awesomes after three seasons and did not renew it for a fourth season due to low ratings.

The Awesomes was the first time Michael Tavera composed music for an adult animated series. Tavera has been well known for composing music for Cartoon Network's Time Squad, Disney's Lilo & Stitch: The Series, and Kids' WB's ¡Mucha Lucha!. Judd Winick, creator of The Life and Times of Juniper Lee, was the show's producer.

Connection to Saturday Night Live
The Awesomes had a strong association with the NBC weekly TV series Saturday Night Live, having starred many current and former SNL cast members including Seth Meyers, Bill Hader, Kenan Thompson, Taran Killam, Bobby Moynihan, Rachel Dratch, Maya Rudolph, Will Forte, Amy Poehler, Kate McKinnon, Colin Quinn, Fred Armisen, Tina Fey, Andy Samberg, Chris Kattan, Cecily Strong, Vanessa Bayer, Noël Wells, Nasim Pedrad and Aidy Bryant as well as SNL writers Steve Higgins, Emily Spivey, Paula Pell, Tim Robinson, Alex Baze and John Lutz. Lorne Michaels served as executive producer, as he has with many other SNL-associated shows. Meyers created the show and Meyers, Killam, Thompson, and Hader all had starring roles while Moynihan, Dratch, Rudolph, Forte, Poehler, McKinnon, Strong and Quinn each had either recurring roles or played various small parts. Of these cast members and writers, Colin Quinn was the only one whose time at SNL did not overlap with Meyers.

Connection to MADtv
Ike Barinholtz, Bobby Lee, Josh Meyers, Taran Killam, and David Herman were all cast members from the Fox series MADtv.

References

External links

The Awesomes at Hulu
 The Awesomes official website

2010s American adult animated television series
2010s American animated comedy television series
2010s American sitcoms
2010s American superhero comedy television series
2013 American television series debuts
2015 American television series endings
American adult animated comedy television series
American adult animated superhero television series
American adult animated web series
American animated sitcoms
American flash adult animated television series
American comedy web series
English-language television shows
Hulu original programming
Works by Seth Meyers
Television series by Broadway Video
Parody superheroes